Richie Lamontagne, known as "The Mountain", born in Everett, Massachusetts, December 20, 1969, is a professional American boxer. Lamontagne's record is 29-7-1 with 24 knockouts. He is also an actor and model. He was U.S.B.F. Cruiserweight Champion, a title won in 1995 with a 9th-round knock out against Fred Adams of Clearwater, Florida. He defended his title six times,  all by knockouts, then received a 12-round split decision loss to Kenny Keene in his home town of Boise, Idaho in 1998. In May 1998, after his loss in Biloxi, Mississippi, to the 1996 Olympic Gold Medalist, Vasily Jirov of Russia, his recognition in the world of boxing and his marketability increased. He appeared on television programs: E.T., Inside Edition, Hard Copy, and Extra. He also appeared in a number of feature films including: A Civil Action, Urban Relics, Moon over Miami, and appeared alongside  Robert De Niro as Carmine in the 1999 film Flawless. He was featured in (G.Q.)Gentlemen's Quarterly Magazine with an 8-page spread in July 1998. Lamontagne has also done ad campaigns for Versace, Calvin Klien, Joe Boxer and Everlast, and appeared in advertisements for Reebok, Naturalizer Shoes, and Naked Fish. Lamontagne was a spokesman for MacPherson Men, an underwear/lingerie maker, for one year.

Professional boxing record

|-
|align="center" colspan=8|29 Wins (24 knockouts, 5 decisions, 0 disqualifications), 7 Losses, 1 Draw, 0 No Contests
|-
|align=center style="border-style: none none solid solid; background: #e3e3e3"|Res.
|align=center style="border-style: none none solid solid; background: #e3e3e3"|Record
|align=center style="border-style: none none solid solid; background: #e3e3e3"|Opponent
|align=center style="border-style: none none solid solid; background: #e3e3e3"|Type
|align=center style="border-style: none none solid solid; background: #e3e3e3"|Rd., Time
|align=center style="border-style: none none solid solid; background: #e3e3e3"|Date
|align=center style="border-style: none none solid solid; background: #e3e3e3"|Location
|align=center style="border-style: none none solid solid; background: #e3e3e3"|Notes
|-align=center
|Loss
|29-7-1
|align=left| Enzo Maccarinelli
|TKO || 4 , 1:04
|2005-01-21 || align=left| Bridgend, Wales, UK
|align=left|
|-align=center
|Win
|29-6-1
|align=left| Allen Smith
|TKO || 1 
|2004-10-08 || align=left| Creston, IA
|
|-align=center
|Loss
|28-6-1
|align=left| Chris Thomas
|TKO || 2 , 2:30
|2003-02-22 || align=left| Elk Grove Village, IL
|
|-align=center
|Loss
|28-5-1
|align=left| Dale Brown
|Decision  || 10
|2003-08-01 || align=left| Hampton Beach, NH
|
|-align=center
|Win
|28-4-1
|align=left| Ernest M-16 Mateen
|TKO || 6 
|2003-05-02 || align=left| Mashantucket, CT
|align=left|
|
|-align=center
|Win
|27-4-1
|align=left| Michael Bennett
|KO || 11 
|2002-08-02 || align=left| Mashantucket, CT
|align=left|
|
|-align=center
|Win
|26-4-1
|align=left| Art Jimmerson
|TKO || 1 
|2002-06-28 || align=left| Boston, MA
|align=left|
|
|-align=center
|Win
|25-4-1
|align=left| Wilfredo Muniz
|TKO || 2 , 1:05
|2002-03-22 || align=left| Boston, MA
|
|-align=center
|Win
|24-4-1
|align=left| Dan Sheehan
|Decision  || 6
|2002-01-25 || align=left| Boston, MA
|
|-align=center
|Win
|23-4-1
|align=left| James Sealey
|KO || 1 
|2001-11-10 || align=left| Savannah, GA
|
|-align=center
|Loss
|22-4-1
|align=left| Gary Wilcox
|Decision  || 8
|2000-07-14 || align=left| Hampton Beach, NH
|
|-align=center
|Win
|22-3-1
|align=left| Brian Hollins
|TKO || 6 
|2000-04-01 || align=left| Boston, MA
|
|-align=center
|Win
|21-3-1
|align=left| Pascal David
|TKO || 5 
|1999-09-30 || align=left| Cranston, RI
|
|-align=center
|Win
|20-3-1
|align=left| Calvin Smith
|TKO || 3 
|1999-02-26 || align=left| Mashantucket, CT
|
|-align=center
|Loss
|19-3-1
|align=left| Sajad Abdul Aziz
|Decision  || 8
|1998-09-25 || align=left| Mashantucket, CT
|
|-align=center
|Loss
|19-2-1
|align=left| Vassiliy Jirov
|Decision  || 12
|1998-05-05 || align=left| Biloxi, MS
|align=left|
|-align=center
|Loss
|19-1
|align=left| Kenny Keene
|Decision  || 12
|1998-01-16 || align=left| Boise, ID
|align=left|
|-align=center
|Win
|19-0
|align=left| Art Bayliss
|Decision  || 8
|1997-12-05 || align=left| Boston, MA
|
|-align=center
|Win
|18-0
|align=left| Doug Davis
|TKO || 6 
|1997-08-08 || align=left| Boston, MA
|
|-align=center
|Win
|17-0
|align=left| Andre Sherrod
|KO || 1 
|1997-06-28 || align=left| Boston, MA
|
|-align=center
|Win
|16-0
|align=left| Domingo Monroe
|TKO || 8 
|1996-06-06 || align=left| Boston, MA
|
|-align=center
|Win
|15-0
|align=left| Jose Hiram Torres
|TKO || 5 
|1995-11-25 || align=left| Stoughton, MA
|
|-align=center
|Win
|14-0
|align=left| Fred Adams
|KO || 9 
|1995-08-24 || align=left| Somerville, MA
|align=left|
|-align=center
|Win
|13-0
|align=left| Jose Hiram Torres
|TKO || 1 
|1995-06-27 || align=left| Boston, MA
|
|-align=center
|Win
|12-0
|align=left| Tony Habibzai
|KO || 1 
|1995-04-22 || align=left| Boston, MA
|
|-align=center
|Win
|11-0
|align=left| Mike Soto
|KO || 1 
|1995-03-14 || align=left| Boston, MA
|
|-align=center
|Win
|10-0
|align=left| Ted Fencher
|KO || 1 
|1995-01-28 || align=left| Boston, MA
|
|-align=center
|Win
|9-0
|align=left| Willie Kemp
|TKO || 5
|1994-12-14 || align=left| Boston, MA
|
|-align=center
|Win
|8-0
|align=left| Willie Kemp
|Decision  || 6
|1994-09-17 || align=left| Revere, MA
|
|-align=center
|style="background: #dae2f1"|Draw
|7-0
|align=left| Ron Preston
|Decision  || 6
|1994-08-11 || align=left| Malden, MA
|
|-align=center
|Win
|6-0
|align=left| Danny Chapman
|KO || 1 
|1994-06-21 || align=left| Boston, MA
|
|-align=center
|Win
|5-0
|align=left| Ed Kelly
|TKO || 1 
|1994-03-15 || align=left| Boston, MA
|
|-align=center
|Win
|4-0
|align=left| Jason Nicholson
|Decision  || 4
|1994-01-23 || align=left| Boston, MA
|
|-align=center
|Win
|3-0
|align=left| Gary McIntyre
|Decision  || 4
|1993-12-03 || align=left| Salem, NH
|
|-align=center
|Win
|2-0
|align=left| Wayne Foster
|KO || 1 
|1993-11-06 || align=left| Revere, MA
|
|-align=center
|Win
|1-0
|align=left| Muhammad Askai
|KO || 1 
|1993-10-13 || align=left| Boston, MA
|
|-align=center
|Win
|0-0
|align=left| Wilbert Miranda
|KO || 1 
|1993-09-10 || align=left| Revere, MA
|

Boxing championships and accomplishments
Titles
 USBF Cruiserweight Title 1995
 EBA Cruiserweight Title 2002
 IBA America's Super Cruiserweight Title 2002

References

External links
 
 

1969 births
Living people
Cruiserweight boxers
Sportspeople from Everett, Massachusetts
American male boxers